Jewish American literature holds an essential place in the literary history of the United States. It encompasses traditions of writing in English, primarily, as well as in other languages, the most important of which has been Yiddish. While critics and authors generally acknowledge the notion of a distinctive corpus and practice of writing about Jewishness in America, many writers resist being pigeonholed as "Jewish voices." Also, many nominally Jewish writers cannot be considered representative of Jewish American literature, one example being Isaac Asimov.

Beginnings
Beginning with the memoirs and petitions composed by the Sephardic immigrants who arrived in America during the mid 17th century, Jewish American writing grew over the subsequent centuries to flourish in other genres as well, including fiction, poetry, and drama. The first notable voice in Jewish- American literature was Emma Lazarus, whose poem "The New Colossus" on the Statue of Liberty became the great hymnal of American immigration. Gertrude Stein became one of the most influential prose-stylists of the early 20th century.

The early twentieth century saw the appearance of two pioneering American Jewish novels: Abraham Cahan's "The Rise of David Levinsky" and Henry Roth's "Call It Sleep". It reached some of its most mature expression in the 20th century "Jewish American novels"  by Saul Bellow, J. D. Salinger, Norman Mailer, Bernard Malamud, Chaim Potok, and Philip Roth. Their work explored the conflicting pulls between secular society and Jewish tradition which were acutely felt by the immigrants who passed through Ellis Island and by their children and grandchildren.

Present day
More recent authors like Paul Auster, Michael Chabon, Ayelet Waldman, Joshua Cohen, Helen Epstein, Jonathan Safran Foer, Alan Kaufman, Nicole Krauss, Lev Raphael, and Art Spiegelman have continued to examine dilemmas of identity in their work, turning their attention especially to the Holocaust and the trends of both ongoing assimilation and cultural rediscovery exhibited by younger generations of American Jews. Arguably the most influential of all American Jewish novels was Leon Uris' Exodus. Its story of the struggle to create the modern state of Israel translated into Russian became the inspiration for hundreds of thousands of Russian immigrants to Israel. Modern Jewish American novels often contain (a few or many) Jewish characters and address issues and themes of importance to Jewish American society such as assimilation, Zionism/Israel, and antisemitism, along with the recent phenomenon known as "New antisemitism."

Four Jewish-American writers have won the Nobel Prize in Literature: Saul Bellow, Joseph Brodsky, Bob Dylan, and Isaac Bashevis Singer. Magazines such as The New Yorker have proved to be instrumental in exposing many Jewish American writers to a wider reading public.

Stereotypes of Jewish People

Although Jewish stereotypes first appeared in works by non-Jewish writers, after World War II, it was often Jewish American writers themselves who evoked such fixed images. The prevalence of antisemitic stereotypes in the works of such authors has sometimes been interpreted an expression of self-hatred; however, Jewish American authors have also used these negative stereotypes in order to refute them.

However, American-Jewish literature has also strongly celebrated American life. It has been primarily more an American than a Jewish literature. Perhaps the preeminent example of this is the great breakthrough novel of Saul Bellow  The Adventures of Augie March.

According to Sanford V. Sternlicht, the first generation of Jewish-American authors presented "realistic portrayals - warts and all" of Jewish immigrants. In contrast, some second or third-generation Jewish-American authors deliberately "reinforced negative stereotypes with satire and a selective realism".

See also
American literature
Literature of Chicago
Early English Jewish literature
Hebrew literature
Ladino literature
List of Jewish American authors
List of Jewish American playwrights
List of Jewish American poets
Secular Jewish culture
Yiddish literature

References

Further reading
Chametzky, Jules, et al. Jewish American Literature: A Norton Anthology. W. W. Norton & Company, Inc., 2001. 
Fried, Lewis, Ed. Handbook of American-Jewish Literature: An Analytical Guide to Topics, Themes, and Sources. Greenwood Press, 1988. 
Furman, Andrew. Israel Through the Jewish-American Imagination: A Survey of Jewish-American Literature on Israel, 1928-1995. SUNY Press, 1997. 
Kramer, Michael P. and Hana Wirth-Nesher. The Cambridge Companion to Jewish American Literature. Cambridge University Press, 2003. 
Kugelmass, Jack, Ed. Key Texts in American Jewish Culture. Rutgers University Press, 2003. 
Nadel, I. B. Jewish Writers of North America: A Guide to Information Sources. Gale Group, 1981. 
Rubin, Derek, Ed. Who We Are: On Being (and Not Being) a Jewish American Writer. Schocken, 2005. 
Weber, Donald. Haunted in the New World. Indiana University Press, 2005. . The book's subtitle, Jewish American Culture from Cahan to The Goldbergs, reflects its broad critical focus.
Wirth-Nesher, Hana. Call It English: The Languages of Jewish American Literature. Princeton University Press, 2008.

External links
These links are currently unavailable.

Comprehensive historical overview of Jewish American literature
News and reviews focusing on Jewish American literature

 
Yiddish-language literature
Jewish theatre
American literature by ethnic background
Literature